Chakradhar Deka (3 September 1963 – 30 December 2007) was an Indian film director, producer, screenwriter, author, entrepreneur and a social activist from Assam. He was the founder of Rajkumar Film Production and Rajashree Theatre.

He was the elder brother of politician Narayan Deka.

Early life 
Chakradhar Deka was born on 3 September 1963 in Mukalmua (Nalbari, Assam). He was a part of the Assam Movement and had served as an advisor in the Barkhetri Anchalik Students Organization.

Deka was also a registered Class 1(A) contractor under Public Works Department of Assam.

Filmography 
Deka entered the film industry in the early 2000s. He worked with popular artists like Jatin Bora, Ravi Sarma, Angoorlata Deka, Aimee Baruah, Zubeen Garg and Shaan.

Theatre 
In 2004, Chakradhar Deka founded Rajashree Theatre, a mobile theatre company in Assam. The theatre has staged 48 plays till date and performed over 10,000 shows in several regions of the state.

In 2005, the theatre adapted the Hollywood classic The Godfather into a play. The adaptation was scripted by Pabitra Kumar Deka.

In 2007, producer Deka collaborated with writer-actor Champak Sharma to recreate the iconic Bollywood film Sholay on stage.

Literature 
In 2001, Chakradhar Deka wrote a book titled Dhanxor Gorahot Axom (Assam on its way of destruction): An Analytical book on Assam's economy.Moromor Bowari (2004), Nuphula Phulor Samadhi (2005), Maa Aru Maammi (2006) and Sendur (2007)'' are the plays written by Deka for his theatre.

Awards

Chakradhar Deka Memorial

Chakradhar Deka Memorial Football Championship 
Deka was a footballer in early stages of his life. He also served as a referee in various local tournaments. A football tournament is organised in his memory and clubs from all over the country are being invited every year.

Chakradhar Deka T20 Cricket Tournament 
A local cricket tournament is organized every year in Mukalmua in the memory of Late Chakradhar Deka.

References 

Assamese-language film directors
Assamese film producers
1963 births
2007 deaths